Mark Zabel (born 12 August 1973 in Calbe, Saxony-Anhalt) is a German sprint canoeist and Surfski Champion. Competing in three Summer Olympics, he won three medals in the K-4 1000 m event with one gold (1996) and two silvers (2000, 2004).

Zabel also won thirteen medals at the ICF Canoe Sprint World Championships with six golds (K-4 500 m: 1998, 1999; K-4 1000 m: 1995, 1997, 1998, 2001), four silvers (K-4 500 m: 1995, 1997; K-4 1000 m: 1999, 2002), and three bronzes (K-4 200 m: 1995, 1997; K-4 1000 m: 2003).

Zabel retired in July 2005 and has now become a coach. He is 190 cm tall and raced at 86 kg (189 lbs).

References

External links
  
 
 

1973 births
Living people
People from Calbe
Canoeists at the 1996 Summer Olympics
Canoeists at the 2000 Summer Olympics
Canoeists at the 2004 Summer Olympics
German male canoeists
Olympic canoeists of Germany
Olympic gold medalists for Germany
Olympic silver medalists for Germany
Olympic medalists in canoeing
ICF Canoe Sprint World Championships medalists in kayak
Medalists at the 2004 Summer Olympics
Medalists at the 2000 Summer Olympics
Medalists at the 1996 Summer Olympics
Sportspeople from Saxony-Anhalt